Crestwood is a suburb of Queanbeyan, New South Wales, Australia. Crestwood is located west of the central business district (CBD) to the west of Ross Road and the north of Canberra Avenue and also borders the Australian Capital Territory.

References 

Localities in New South Wales
Queanbeyan